Maelruanaidh mac Tadhg was the fourth king of Moylurg, and reigned sometime in the late 11th (and possibly into the early 12th) century. The only date associated with his reign, 1080, may simply be provisional.

References
 "Mac Dermot of Moylurg: The Story of a Connacht Family", Dermot Mac Dermot, 1996.
 http://www.macdermot.com/

Kings of Connacht
11th-century Irish monarchs
People from County Roscommon
MacDermot family